Diaspasis is a genus consisting of a single species—Diaspasis filifolia—in the family Goodeniaceae native to southwestern Australia.

References

Goodeniaceae
Endemic flora of Southwest Australia
Monotypic Asterales genera